Sara Wookey is an American dance artist, researcher and consultant currently based in London. She specialises in relational artistic practices in the museum and civic spaces. She holds a B.F.A. in Dance from Ohio State University and an M.F.A. in Dance from UCLA. Her practice explores social and spatial approaches to dance and choreography. In 2020 she completed her Doctoral thesis Spatial Relations: Dance in the Changing Museum through the Centre for Dance Research (C-DaRE) at Coventry University.

Choreography

Wookey established herself as a young choreographer in the Netherlands where she was based between 1996-2006. There she was supported by grants from the Netherlands Funds for the Performing Arts and Amsterdam Funds for the Arts, among others. Danswerkplaats Amsterdam (now Dansmakers), a dance house, administered her projects. She created over a dozen evening-length dance works that toured in Europe and North America. Her solo work "Disappearing Acts & Resurfacing Subjects: Concerns of (a) Dance Artist(s)" (2014) premiered at the New Museum, NYC as part of the Performance Archiving Performance program.

Civic Art Projects in Los Angeles

From 2008-2014 Wookey worked as an artist in Los Angeles, California. She worked on several collaborative projects namely Being Pedestrian with artist Sara Daleiden. From 2012-2014 Wookey was a consultant with the Creative Services Department at LA Metro where she designed Metro Art Moves You artist-led tours of public art along Los Angeles's light rail lines.

There she taught at the California Institute of the Arts (CalArts) and initiated a partnership between CalArts and the Community Redevelopment Agency of Los Angeles where art students proposed creative civic projects to urban planners and stakeholders in downtown Los Angeles.

Museum Projects

Wookey has been engaged with museums since the late 1990s presenting her work, engaging in learning programs and lecturing. Notable commissions include: "Performing Navigations: (Re)Mapping the Museum" (2010) at the Hammer Museum and "Punt.Point" (2014) at van Abbe Museum in the Netherlands. which is part of the permanent collection being purchased in 2017.

Yvonne Rainer

Wookey has worked closely with choreographer Yvonne Rainer since the 2010. She is one of five dance artists certified by Rainer to teach and perform her iconic work Trio A (1966). Rainer's other works: Chair Pillow 1969, Diagonal (part of Terrain) 1963; and Talking Solo (part of Terrain) 1963 are also taught and performed by Wookey.  Much of Wookey's own practice is closely connected to her work in the Netherlands in the 1990s, American Post-Modern dance and European contexts for dance. Her practice is closely connected to ideas of transmission, value and language.
In "Disappearing Acts & Resurfacing Subjects: Concerns of (a) Dance Artist(s)" (2014)  Wookey meditated on dance as an ephemeral dance form and questioned what this meant for institutions as well as for the dancer's themselves. In the work, Wookey referenced her own previous choreographies, her work with Rainer, direct address, use of props and video to create an independent performance work. Her 2013 project, reDance, featured re-enacted works and processes of renowned choreographers of the Judson Dance Theater.

Activism

Wookey actively advocates for the rights of dance artists. In 2011 she auditioned for Marina Abramović's An Artist's LIfe's Manifesto"—a group performance work created by Abramovic for the 2011 Annual Gala at the Museum of Contemporary Art, Los Angeles.

Wookey declined to the offer to participate after realizing that the compensation provided was not sufficient and conditions questionable, following up the invitation with an open letter to artists.

Since then Wookey has continued to speak out for fair compensation and treatment of performance artists. More recent publications include: Disappearing Acts & Resurfacing Subjects: Concerns of (a) Dance Artist(s) in The Ethics of Art: Ecological Turns in the Performing Arts edited by Guy Cools and Pascal Gielen (2015) and published by Valiz Press and Collective Thinking.

References

External links 
 Official Website

UCLA School of the Arts and Architecture alumni
American choreographers
Ohio State University College of Arts and Sciences alumni